The 2010 Latvian Individual Speedway Championship was the 36th Latvian Individual Speedway Championship season. The final took place on 12 September 2010 in Daugavpils, Latvia.

Results
 September 12, 2010
  Daugavpils

Speedway in Latvia
2010 in Latvian sport
2010 in speedway